Grimsby Town railway station serves the town of Grimsby in North East Lincolnshire, England. It is operated by TransPennine Express, and is also served by East Midlands Railway and Northern Trains services.

History
Grimsby Town station was opened on 29 February 1848 when the Manchester, Sheffield and Lincolnshire Railway opened its line from New Holland to Grimsby, and thence by the East Lincolnshire Railway to Louth.

The remaining line runs east to west, terminating at Cleethorpes on the northeast Lincolnshire seafront, and runs west to Habrough where the line to Barton-upon-Humber branches northwards, and further to Barnetby, where at Wrawby Junction the line splits into three, going to Scunthorpe/Doncaster/Sheffield, Gainsborough/Retford/Sheffield and Market Rasen/Lincoln/Newark.

On 13 November 1907 a fireman was killed in an accident at the station when oiling his locomotive, five trucks were shunted on to the end of the train. The impact sent the train forward and the fireman was trapped in the machinery. He could not be extricated without the engine being reversed and backed to the original place, and this action resulted in him being mangled in the machinery and he was killed.

In a collision on 15 July 1930, 32 people were injured when a train from New Holland crashed into an express train from Sheffield which was stationary in Grimsby Station.

The station was refurbished by First TransPennine Express in 2007/2008. Brand new departure screens have been fitted and are now in use, along with an automated announcement system (CIS). The ticket office has also been refurbished, the refurbishment includes new lighting, seating, flooring and a refurbished ticket desk. The waiting room on platform 2 and the station buffet have also been refurbished. Two new lifts at a cost of £2 million were installed in 2011 and were opened by Grimsby MP Austin Mitchell on Tuesday 19 July 2011.

In December 2017, the announcement system was changed from Rob Randall (TransPennine Express's old Announcement System) with SIEMENS, to ATOS Anne, which is now the announcement system in use across the TransPennine Express network.

Description
The station has three platforms in use, with an overall roof (renewed in 1978) covering platforms 1 and 2.  Platform 1 is the main eastbound through platform, whilst platform 2 is the corresponding platform for westbound trains but is also signalled for eastbound services if required. Platform 3 is the outer face of the southern island platform and is located outside the train shed - this was formerly a through platform used by Doncaster and Lincoln trains but is now only accessible from the west and is normally used by EMR trains from the Lincoln direction that turn back here. The main facilities (ticket office, buffet & waiting room) are all located on platform 1.

The ticket office is staffed daily from 06:00 (weekdays)/05:30 (Saturdays)/08:45 (Sundays) until 19:30. A self-service ticket machine is also available at the station entrance for use outside these times and for collecting pre-paid tickets. Customer help points are available on platforms 1 and 2 and step-free access is available to all platforms.

The station has the PlusBus scheme where train and bus tickets can be bought together at a saving, it is in the same area as Grimsby Docks and Cleethorpes stations.

Services
Services at the station are operated by East Midlands Railway, Northern Trains and TransPennine Express.

On Saturdays, there are also three trains per day between Cleethorpes and  via  which are operated by Northern Trains.

On Sundays, the TransPennine Express service is two-hourly in the morning but increases to hourly in the afternoon. During the summer months, there are three East Midlands Railway services between Nottingham and Cleethorpes and four services to Barton-on-Humber with no services on either of these routes in the winter.

Proposed changes
In January 2021, the Department for Transport opened a consultation on proposals to improve services around Manchester and improve reliability with the options proposed by the Manchester Recovery Taskforce. Options B and C proposed the Manchester Airport to Cleethorpes service be diverted to  via  instead of running to the airport, providing a direct link to Liverpool and Warrington. If either of these options are chosen, the changes would come into force in May 2022.

References

External links

Photos of the station in the 1970s & 80s

Railway stations in the Borough of North East Lincolnshire
Former Great Central Railway stations
Railway stations in Great Britain opened in 1848
Railway stations served by East Midlands Railway
Railway stations served by TransPennine Express
Northern franchise railway stations
DfT Category D stations